Besondere Kennzeichen: keine is a 1956 German drama film directed by Joachim Kunert.

Cast 
 Erika Müller-Fürstenau - Gerda Krause
 Christoph Engel - Bernd
 Rolf Moebius - Werner Schneider
 Erich Mirek - Zimmermann
 Horst Naumann - Klaus
 Elfriede Garden - Gerdas Freundin Jutta
 Anneliese Grummt - Uschi
 Hans-Joachim Martens - Jürgen
 Magdalene von Nußbaum - Mutter Becker
 Gertrud Brendler - Fräulein Grethmann
 Waldemar Jacobi - Vater Becker
 Erika Dunkelmann - Hanna - Gerdas Arbeitskollegin

External links 

1956 films
East German films
1950s German films
German romantic drama films
1956 romantic drama films
German black-and-white films